Enoggera was an electoral district of the Legislative Assembly in the Australian state of Queensland. It existed from 1873 to 1950 and centred on the suburb of Enoggera in Brisbane.

The electorate was created by the Electoral Districts Act of 1872. From 1873 to 1878 it returned a single member. From 1878 to 1888 it became a dual member constituency (returning two members). From 1888 to 1950 it reverted to returning a single member.

In 1950 an electoral redistribution resulted in the name being dropped, with the bulk of its territory being split between Kedron and Mount Coot-tha.

Members for Enoggera

The members representing the electoral district of Enoggera are listed below.

See also
 Electoral districts of Queensland
 Members of the Queensland Legislative Assembly by year
 :Category:Members of the Queensland Legislative Assembly by name

References

Former electoral districts of Queensland